The Dilettantes are an American alternative rock band based in San Francisco Bay Area. They consist of Brian Jonestown Massacre member Joel Gion (vocals, tambourines, and maracas), Jefferson Parker (guitar, vocals), Brock Galland (guitar, vocals), KC Kozak (drums), and Nick Marcantonio (bass guitar). To date they have released one studio album, 2007's 101 Tambourines, which received mixed reviews.

References

External links 
 The Dilettantes at Happy Parts Recordings
 

Musical groups from San Francisco
Alternative rock groups from California